The 2006–07 FIS Cross-Country World Cup was a multi-race tournament over a season for cross-country skiers. It was the 26th official World Cup season in cross-country skiing for men and women. The season began on 28 October 2006 with 800m sprint races for women in Düsseldorf which was eventually won by Marit Bjørgen of Norway. This season, Tour de Ski was a part of the World Cup for the first time. The World Cup is organised by the FIS who also run world cups and championships in ski jumping, snowboarding and alpine skiing amongst others.

Calendar
Both men's and women's events tend to be held at the same resorts over a 2 or 3 day period. Listed below is a list of races which equates with the points table further down this page.

The Tour de Ski is a series of events which count towards the World Cup. The inaugural Tour de Ski was supposed to start with the meet at Nové Město, but due to lack of snow the first two events were cancelled. The 1st Tour the Ski started in München and concluded at Val di Fiemme.

Men

Women

Men's team

Women's team

Men's standings
Below are tables showing the number of points won in the 2006–07 Cross-Country Skiing World Cup for men.

The first place skier got 100 points, second place got 80, 3rd - 60, 4th - 50, 5th - 45, 6th - 40, 7th - 36, 8th - 32, 9th - 29, 10th - 26, 11th - 24, 12th - 22, 13th - 20, 14th - 18, 15th - 16, 16th - 15... and from then on all the way to 30th - 1 point.

11 distance events and five sprint events counted in the World Cup overall standings.

Overall

Women's standings
Below are tables showing the number of points won in the 2006–07 Cross-Country Skiing World Cup for women.

The first place skier got 100 points, second place got 80, 3rd - 60, 4th - 50, 5th - 45, 6th - 40, 7th - 36, 8th - 32, 9th - 29, 10th - 26, 11th - 24, 12th - 22, 13th - 20, 14th - 18, 15th - 16, 16th - 15... and from then on all the way to 30th - 1 point.

11 distance events and five sprint events counted in the World Cup overall standings.

Overall

Nations Cup
This is the sum of all individual points scored plus points for relay events. Relays count double (200 to the winner), while two teams may be counted for team sprints.

Overall

Achievements
Victories in this World Cup (all-time number of victories as of 2006/07 season in parentheses)

Men
 , 4 (10) first places
 , 4 (4) first places
 , 2 (11) first places
 , 2 (8) first places
 , 2 (7) first places
 , 1 (11) first place
 , 1 (6) first place
 , 1 (2) first place
 , 1 (2) first place
 , 1 (1) first place
 , 1 (1) first place
 , 1 (1) first place
 , 1 (1) first place
 , 1 (1) first place
 , 1 (1) first place
 , 1 (1) first place
 , 1 (1) first place
 , 1 (1) first place

Women
 , 10 (14) first places
 , 3 (29) first places
 , 3 (19) first places
 , 3 (4) first places
 , 1 (16) first place
 , 1 (2) first place
 , 1 (2) first place
 , 1 (1) first place
 , 1 (1) first place
 , 1 (1) first place
 , 1 (1) first place

Retirements

Men

Women

See also
2007 in cross-country skiing

External links 
FIS Official Site World Cup Results
FIS Official Site World Cup Results - Tour De Ski
Eurosport World Cup Coverage

Notes

 
World Cup 2006-07
World Cup 2006-07
FIS Cross-Country World Cup seasons